Michael Lameck, known as Ata (born 15 September 1949), is a former German footballer.

Career
Lameck started his career during the Regionalliga West 1969–70 season with Schwarz-Weiß Essen. During his time in Bochum from 1972 until 1988, he played a total of 518 matches in the Bundesliga, and is thereby the record holder for most matches played for the Ruhr Valley team while being ninth on the all-time Bundesliga list for matches played. Additionally, he holds the distinction of having played the most matches in Bundesliga history without ever receiving a cap for national duty.

Statistics

Honours
VfL Bochum
 DFB-Pokal: runner-up 1987–88

References

1949 births
Living people
German footballers
Germany B international footballers
Germany under-21 international footballers
VfL Bochum players
Bundesliga players
Association football defenders
Association football fullbacks
Association football wingers
Freiburger FC players
Freiburger FC managers
SC Paderborn 07 managers
German football managers
Footballers from Essen